Charles Elmer Dietrich (July 30, 1889 – May 20, 1942) was a Democratic member of the U.S. House of Representatives from Pennsylvania for one term from 1935 to 1937.

Early life and career
Charles E. Dietrich was born in Tunkhannock, Pennsylvania.  He graduated from Wyoming Seminary in Kingston, Pennsylvania, in 1907.  

He owned and operated a theater from 1914 to 1942.  He was engaged in agricultural pursuits from 1924 to 1942.  He served as prothonotary and clerk of the courts of Wyoming County, Pennsylvania, from 1920 to 1935.  He was a delegate to the 1932 Democratic National Convention.

Congress
In 1934 Dietrich defeated disgraced incumbent Louis T. McFadden and was the only Democrat to win the 15th district between 1912 and 1950.  He was an unsuccessful candidate for reelection in 1936.

After Congress
He resumed former business pursuits, and died in Tunkhannock.  Interment in Sunnyside Cemetery.

Sources

The Political Graveyard

1889 births
1942 deaths
Pennsylvania prothonotaries
People from Tunkhannock, Pennsylvania
Democratic Party members of the United States House of Representatives from Pennsylvania
20th-century American politicians